"Justice Will Prevail at Last" is a song written and recorded by Japanese-American singer-songwriter Ai. Released on May 9, 2017 by EMI Records and Universal Music Group, it served as the lead single for Ai's eleventh studio album, Wa to Yo.

Background and release 

Recorded originally for the second season of the Japanese drama show Emergency Interrogation Room, Ai teased an excerpt of the track in a video announcing Wa to Yo in April 2017. "Justice Will Prevail at Last" was released digitally on May 9, 2017. Kate Moross served as the art director for the accompanying lyric video.

Composition and lyrics 

Musically, "Justice Will Prevail at Last" is a J-pop and electropop song. Multiple critics have described that the song heavily incorporates sounds similar to chiptune music found in early video games. Traditional Japanese instruments such as the taiko are also used within the song. Lyrically, the track is about confronting the evil in the world.

Track listing 
Credits adapted from Apple Music, Tidal and official album profile. All tracks written by Ai Uemura.

Charts

Release history

Notes

References 

2017 singles
Ai (singer) songs
Japanese-language songs
2017 songs
EMI Records singles
Songs written by Ai (singer)
Song recordings produced by Ai (singer)